Nasir Javed (born 21 June 1966) is a Pakistani born American cricketer.  Javed was a right-handed batsman who bowled leg break googly.  He was born in Lahore, Punjab.

Javed started his cricket career in his native Pakistan, playing first-class cricket for Lahore City in 1984–85, Lahore City Whites in 1984–85 and Servis Industries in 1986–87 as a bowler.  Later he emigrated to the United States of America and played for his adopted country in the 1998–99 Red Stripe Bowl in Jamaica, the 2001 ICC Trophy in Canada, and the 2002 ICC Americas Championship in Argentina. Javed also played in the 2004 ICC Six Nations Challenge, which the Americans won to qualify for the 2004 ICC Champions Trophy in England. Javed competed in the second-ever One Day International played by the United States, a heavy defeat to Australia at the Rose Bowl.  Javed later played for the United States in the 2005 ICC Trophy.

References

External links
Cricinfo page on Nasir Javed
espncricinfo page on Nasir Javed

1966 births
Living people
American cricketers
Pakistani cricketers
Service Industries cricketers
United States One Day International cricketers
Pakistani emigrants to the United States
Cricketers from Lahore
Lahore City Whites cricketers
Lahore City cricketers
Coaches of the United States national cricket team
American cricket coaches
Pakistani cricket coaches
American sportspeople of Pakistani descent